The 8 cm Granatwerfer 34 (8 cm GrW 34) was the standard German infantry mortar throughout World War II. It was noted for its accuracy and rapid rate of fire.

History 
The weapon was of conventional design and broke down into three loads (smooth bore barrel, bipod, baseplate) for transport. Attached to the bipod were a traversing handwheel and a cross-leveling handwheel below the elevating mechanism. A panoramic sight was mounted on the traversing mechanism yoke for fine adjustments. A line on the tube could be used for rough laying.

The 8 cm GrW 34/1 was an adaptation for use in self-propelled mountings. A lightened version with a shorter barrel was put into production as the kurzer 8 cm Granatwerfer 42.

The mortar employed conventional 8 cm 3.5 kg shells (high explosive or smoke) with percussion fuzes. The range could be extended by fitting up to three additional powder charges between the shell tailfins.

A total of 74,336,000 rounds of ammunition were produced for the Granatwerfer 34 from September 1939 to March 1945.

Ammunition 
List of available ammunition for the Granatwerfer 34.

See also 
 List of infantry mortars

Weapons of comparable role, performance and era
 Brandt Mle 27/31 original French mortar design of the 1920s, after which all 3″/8 cm/81.4 mm/82 mm mortars of the Second World War era were patterned
 Ordnance ML 3 inch Mortar British equivalent
 M1 mortar US equivalent

Citations

General sources 
 Gander, Terry and Chamberlain, Peter. Weapons of the Third Reich: An Encyclopedic Survey of All Small Arms, Artillery and Special Weapons of the German Land Forces 1939–1945. New York: Doubleday, 1979

External links 

 German: Mortars & Infantry Guns
 German Infantry Mortars
 WW II German Infantry Anti-Tank Weapons (Archived 2009-10-23)

81mm mortars
World War II infantry mortars of Germany
Military equipment introduced in the 1930s